Thomas Fitzpatrick (February 6, 1909 – April 15, 1972) was an American lawyer and politician from New York.

Life
He was born on February 6, 1909. He attended St. Monica's School in Jamaica, Queens, and St. John's Preparatory School in Brooklyn. He graduated B.A. from St. John's College; and LL.B. and J.S.D. from St. John's University School of Law. He practiced law in New York City, and entered politics as a Democrat.

Fitzpatrick was a member of the New York State Assembly (Queens Co., 11th D.) in 1945 and 1946.

He was again a member of the State Assembly from 1949 to 1954, sitting in the 167th, 168th, 169th and 170th New York State Legislatures.

In 1954, he was appointed by Mayor Robert F. Wagner, Jr. as a City Magistrate, became a justice of the Criminal Court in 1962, and remained on the bench until his death in 1972.

He died on April 15, 1972, at his home in Jamaica, Queens, of a heart attack.

Sources

1909 births
1972 deaths
Democratic Party members of the New York State Assembly
St. John's University (New York City) alumni
People from Queens, New York
St. John's University School of Law alumni
New York (state) state court judges
20th-century American judges
20th-century American politicians